is a railway station on the Keikyu Airport Line in Ōta, Tokyo, Japan, operated by the private railway operator Keikyu. It is situated directly beneath Tokyo International Airport ("Haneda Airport").

Lines

Station layout
The station consists of an underground island platform serving two terminating tracks. The West Exit leads to Terminal 1 of the airport, and the East Exit leads to Terminal 2.

Platforms

History
On 1 December 2004, the East Exit opened following the opening of the Terminal 2 building.

The station was renamed  on 21 October 2010, when Haneda Airport International Terminal Station opened to serve the newly built international terminal of the airport. 

Keikyu introduced station numbering to its stations on 21 October 2010; Haneda Airport Domestic Terminal Station was assigned station number KK17.

The station was renamed again on 14 March 2020 to Haneda Airport Terminal 1·2 Station, coinciding with the change in the names of all three of Haneda's terminal buildings.

In May 2021, All Nippon Airways Co. installed 12 automated gates and electric wheelchairs to reach the boarding gate after passing the security check

Expansion 
On 8 August 2022, construction started on a pocket track and switch past the current station. Once complete, this will allow capacity on the Airport Line to increase by three trains per hour. In order to accommodate construction, a portion of the passenger walkway from the station to Terminal 2 has been closed off.

Passenger statistics
In fiscal 2011, the station was used by an average of 68,894 passengers daily.

Surrounding area
 Haneda Airport domestic terminals 1 & 2
 Shuto Expressway Wangan Line
 National Route 357

References

External links

 Keikyu station information 
 Keikyu Guide to Haneda Airport 

Airport railway stations in Japan
Keikyū Airport Line
Stations of Keikyu
Railway stations in Tokyo
Railway stations in Japan opened in 1998
Haneda Airport
Ōta, Tokyo